E.A. — Extraordinary Accident is a 1958 Soviet drama film directed by Viktor Ivchenko. It was the box office leader of 1959 in the Soviet Union having had more than 47 million viewers. The film is based on real events of the capture of the Soviet tanker "Tuapse" in 23 June 1954.

Plot
The film is set in 1954. Soviet tanker "Poltava" traveling with kerosene to China, is captured by the Kuomintang. Additionally the motorist Raiskiy is accused of accidentally killing one of the soldiers (it turns out later that he is still alive), and under this pretext, the Kuomintang begin to look for the "killer", using this incident as one of the reasons for the ship's detention. The tanker with crew is delivered to Taiwan, where they are persuaded to voluntarily go over to the "genuine freedom and democracy", and are treated exceptionally well: they are housed in a luxurious villa, given food and drink. When persuasion does not work on them, they start using very different measures: concentration camp and oppression. Heroic adventures follow. Some return home after a few months, others only through many years, and some do not come back at all. The story is told from the viewpoint of the captain's first mate of educational work (played by Mikhail Kuznetsov).

Cast
Mikhail Kuznetsov — Anton Kovalenko 
Alexander Anurov — Leonid Kalugin
Vyacheslav Tikhonov — Victor Rayskiy
Taisiya Litvinenko — Rita Voronkovа
Anatoly Solovyov  Grachev
Giuli Chokhonelidze — Javakheti
Dmitri Kapka — Kharitonenko
Vladimir Rudin — Ivan Frolov
Yuri Sarychev
Paul Usovnichenko — Nikolai  Sakharov
Vladimir Dalsky — Fang
Vladimir Uan-Zo-Li — Gao
Alexander Tolstoy — Doronin
Valery Zinoviev
Boris Ivchenko
Eugene Baliev - Sokolov
Witold Yanpavlis
Alexander Barushnoy — French Ambassador
Vladimir Volchik — American officer

Awards
First prize for art direction (M. Yuferov)
Second Prize for direction of the film (V. Ivchenko) TCF-59 in Kyiv.

References

External links

See Also
 Capture of Tanker Tuapse

1958 crime drama films
1958 films
Soviet action films
Soviet crime drama films
1950s action films
Soviet black-and-white films

Films set in Taiwan